A team of Amateurs under the captaincy of Arthur Priestley toured the West Indies in the 1896-97 season playing matches between January and March 1897. They played a total of sixteen matches of which nine are regarded as first-class. They did not play in British Guiana.

The team
A party of thirteen was taken:

 Arthur Priestley, captain
 Cyril Beldam
 Frederick Bush
 Gilbert Elliott
 James Leigh
 Legh Barratt 
 Richard Lewis
 Richard Palairet
 Henry Stanley
 Andrew Stoddart
 Charles Stone
 Billy Williams
 Sammy Woods

Bush, Barratt and Priestley had been in the Slade Lucas tour to the West Indies two year previously. Priestley had played a single first-class match for the M.C.C. in 1895 but otherwise none of the 3 had played first-class cricket between the two tours. Elliott had not played first class cricket before the tour while Williams and Leigh had not played first-class cricket for almost 10 years. However the remaining 7 had played first-class cricket in 1896 and so the team was clearly stronger than Lucas's two years earlier. In 1896 Palairet, Stanley and Woods had played for Somerset, Beldam and Stoddart for Middlesex, Stone for Leicestershire and Lewis for Oxford University. Stoddart had played for England during the 1896 season while Woods had played against South Africa in 1895–96. All the 13 played at least three first-class matches on the tour. G.A. Maclean played in a minor match.

The tour
The team left Southampton on December 30 and arrived back in England on April 14.

Matches played were:

 January 13, 14 : v Barbados
 January 15, 16 : v St. Vincent (in Barbados)
 January 18, 19 : v Barbados
 January 21, 22, 23 : v Barbados
 January 28, 29, 30 : v Antigua
 February 1, 2, 3 : v St. Kitts
 February 6, 8 : v United Services (in Barbados)
 February 12, 13 : v Queen's Park (in Trinidad)
 February 15, 16, 18 : v All West Indies (in Trinidad)
 February 19, 20, 22 : v Trinidad
 February 25, 26, 27 : v Trinidad
 March 13, 15 : v All Jamaica, 12-a-side
 March 16, 17 : v All Jamaica
 March 19, 20 : v Black River C.C. (in Jamaica) 12-a-side
 March 24, 25 : v North Side (in Jamaica) 12-a-side
 March 27, 29 : v All Jamaica, 12-a-side

First class matches are highlighted.

Of the 9 first class matches, 4 were won and 5 lost. Overall 10 matches were won, 5 lost and 1 drawn. All 5 matches in Jamaica were won, Gilbert Livingston being the only effective player for Jamaica. The results achieved by the tourists were regarded as disappointing, Stoddart being the one great success.

Stoddart was the leading batsman scoring over 1000 runs in all games at an average of over 50. In first-class matches he scored 416 runs at an average of 27. He scored all 6 of the centuries scored by the tourists including 2 in first-class games. Stoddart was also the leading bowling with over 100 wickets in all matches at an average under 8 and over 50 in first-class games alone averaging under 10.

The most important match was that against All West Indies in Port of Spain in February. The West Indies team contained players from Trinidad, British Guiana and Barbados and was captained by Aucher Warner, the brother of Plum Warner. The tourists set their opponents 141 to win in the last innings which they achieved for the loss of 7 wickets, having been 41–6 at one stage. Richard Palairet was leading scorer in both the tourists' innings with 45 and 46. Clifford Goodman and Archie Cumberbatch took 9 wickets each for the West Indians as did Andrew Stoddart for the tourists. The leading batsmen for the West Indies were Harold Austin and Lebrun Constantine.

Averages

The following averages are in the 9 first class matches (Batting Bowling).

Batting

Bowling

See also
Lord Hawke's XI cricket team in West Indies in 1896-97 for reasons for the 'twin' tours.

References

External sources
 CricketArchive

Annual reviews
 James Lillywhite's Cricketers' Annual 1898 page 53
 Wisden Cricketers' Almanack 1898, pages 396 to 404

Further reading
 Peter Wynne-Thomas, The Complete History of Cricket Tours at Home & Abroad, Guild, 1989
 Cricket - A Weekly Record of the Game 1897

1897 in English cricket
1897 in West Indian cricket
1896-97
January 1897 sports events
February 1897 sports events
March 1897 sports events
International cricket competitions from 1888–89 to 1918
West Indian cricket seasons from 1890–91 to 1917–18